is a subprefecture of Hokkaido Prefecture, Japan. The population density of the subprefecture, 13 people per km2, is very low compared to the rest of Japan. The population of Rumoi Subprefecture represents 0.96% of the overall population of Hokkaido.

Geography 
Rumoi Subprefecture stretches broadly across the coast of the Sea of Japan in northwestern Hokkaido.

Municipalities

Mergers

Rivers
The Rumoi River  flows from Mount Poroshiri in the Hidaka Mountain range to the Sea of Japan.

History 
Mashike Subprefecture was established as part of the administrative reforms of Hokkaido during the Meiji period (1868 – 1912). The capital was moved to Rumoi in 1914, and the subprefecture was renamed to Rumoi Subprefecture in the same year. Toyotomi Town) in Teshio District transferred to Sōya Subprefecture in 1948, and Horonobe was transferred to Sōya Subprefecture in 2010.

Economy 

The fishing industries dominates the economy of the area, and seafood processing remains a thriving industry.

See also 
Sankebetsu brown bear incident

References

External links

 

Subprefectures in Hokkaido